John Kingston is an American linguist and Professor of Linguistics at University of Massachusetts Amherst. He is known for his works on phonology.

References

Phonologists
Living people
University of Massachusetts Amherst faculty
Year of birth missing (living people)
Linguists from the United States